The Historia Sicula is a chronicle and work written in Latin Medieval prose about the story of the Kingdom of Sicily and Kingdom of Naples, taking place between the years 1250 and 1293. The text was edited by Bartholomaeus of Neocastro. The work is important as it is the best known account of the Sicilian Vespers.

Author 
Few things are known about the author, Bartholomaeus of Neocastro. It is known that he was a bureaucrat from Messina who first practiced law before assuming bureaucratic assignments with the Aragonese court of the Kingdom of Sicily. These included several delicate diplomatic missions. It is in this position that Bartholomaeus was a direct and close witness to the narrated series of events. In some cases, he was a spectator from the inside.

Summary 
The work reflects the desires of the author to be witness to historical events that would change his homeland. It is written in Latin in prose. The narrative begins with the death of Frederick II of Swabia in 1250 to the summer of 1293.

References 

13th-century Latin books
Italian chronicles
13th century in the Kingdom of Sicily
13th century in the Kingdom of Naples
Frederick II, Holy Roman Emperor